Anampses neoguinaicus, the New Guinea wrasse, 
is a fish found in the Western Pacific Ocean.

References

New Guinea wrasse
Fish described in 1878
Taxa named by Pieter Bleeker